Jaroslav Rygl (born 1970) is a Czech mountain bike orienteer and ski orienteering competitor. He won a silver medal in the middle distance at the 2005 World MTB Orienteering Championships in  Banska Bystrica, and a bronze medal in the long distance at the 2007 World MTB Orienteering Championships in  Nove Mesto na Morave. With the Czech relay team he won medals at the 2007 and 2008 World MTB Orienteering Championships.

References

1970 births
Czech orienteers
Male orienteers
Czech male cyclists
Mountain bike orienteers
Living people